The Church of St. Stephen in Borovo is a Serbian Orthodox church in eastern Croatia. The church was built in the period from 1761 to 1764. First educational activities in the village were carried out under its patronage. Church is listed in Register of Cultural Goods of Croatia. Iconostasis with 49 icons and other inventory is also specifically listed in Register.

See also
Eparchy of Osječko polje and Baranja
Serbs of Croatia
List of Serbian Orthodox churches in Croatia

References

Churches completed in 1764
18th-century Eastern Orthodox church buildings
Borovo
Register of Cultural Goods of the Republic of Croatia
1764 establishments in the Habsburg monarchy